Yarullin is a surname. Notable people with the surname include:

Albert Yarullin (born 1993), Russian ice hockey player
Färit Yarullin (1914–1943), Russian composer